Mosaicoolithus is an oogenus of fossil egg from the Cenomanian Chichengshan Formation (Tiantai Group) and Albian to Cenomanian Laijia Formation (Qujiang Group) of Tiantai County, Zhejiang Province in China. Its classification is uncertain. The eggs are spherical, and 8.8 cm in diameter. It is distinctive for having irregular pore canals, sometimes filled by secondary shell units. Originally, it was classified as two separate oospecies of Spheroolithus: S. zhangtoucaoensis and S. jincunensis. However, these oospecies were synonymized and placed into a new oogenus by Wang et al. (2011).

References 

Egg fossils
Albian life
Cenomanian life
Cretaceous animals of Asia
Cretaceous China
Fossils of China
Fossil parataxa described in 2011